Kota Deltamas (Delta Mas City) is an integrated industrial, commercial and residential township at Cikarang, West Java, Indonesia. The township located between Jakarta and Bandung city, which has land area of about 3000 hectares. It is being developed by Indonesian conglomerate Sinar Mas Land and Japanese Sojitz.

The township has residential, commercial and industrial area, supported by other civic amenities. Residential area is about 26% of the total land area of Kota Deltamas. Administrative offices of Bekasi regency are located within the township,

Industrial park
The industrial estate of the township is known as Greenland International Industrial Center(GIIC), which has land area of 1500 hectares. Several global investors, such as Mitsubishi and Suzuki, have established their manufacturing facilities there.

Facilities
Le Premier Hotel
Sakura Park Hotel and Residence
Sancrest serviced apartment
ITSB
Jakarta International University campus
Pangudi Luhur School
Deltamas Sports-center
Malibu Clubhouse
Pasadena Serenade Swimming Pool
K-Education Complex

Transportation 
The township has direct access to Jakarta-Cikampek Toll Road at KM 37. Shuttle buses are available within the township.

See also
Cikarang
Jabodetabek
Sinar Mas Group

References

Bekasi
West Java
Post-independence architecture of Indonesia
Planned townships in Indonesia
Planned communities